"Super Fly Meets Shaft" is a break-in record co-written by Dickie Goodman and recorded by John & Ernest.  It consists of lines from popular R&B/soul songs of the day, which tell a story about the main characters from the films Super Fly (1972) and Shaft (1971).

"Super Fly Meets Shaft" became an American hit in the spring of 1973, reaching #31 on the Billboard Hot 100.

Background
Among the songs sampled in the record is Billy Paul's "Me and Mrs. Jones", with three excerpts.  Others include:
 "S.O.S. (Stop Her On Sight)" - Winfield Parker 
 "I Gotcha" - Joe Tex 
 "Papa Was a Rollin' Stone" - The Temptations
 "Keeper of the Castle" - Four Tops
 "I'll Be Around" - The Spinners
 "I Got Ants in My Pants" - James Brown
 "Theme from Shaft" - Isaac Hayes
 "Back Stabbers" - The O'Jays
 "Could It Be I'm Falling in Love" - The Spinners
 "Love Train" - The O'Jays
 "Freddie's Dead" - Curtis Mayfield
 "Daddy's Home" - Jermaine Jackson
 "Superfly" - Curtis Mayfield

Chart history

References

External links
Lyrics of this song
 

Songs about fictional male characters
1973 songs
1973 singles
Novelty songs
Fiction set in 1973